Tulpan (Tıýlpan) is a 2008 Kazakh drama film. It was directed by Sergey Dvortsevoy and distributed by Zeitgeist Films. Tulpan was Kazakhstan's 2009 Academy Awards official submission to Foreign Language Film category. It won the award for Best Film at the 2nd Asia Pacific Screen Awards.

Overview 
Asa, a recently discharged Russian Navy sailor, is living in the remote Kazakhstan steppe with his sister Samal, her older husband, Ondas, and their three children. He dreams of becoming a herdsman and owning his own ranch, but he believes that to attain this goal, he must first marry. Asa hopes to marry Tulpan, the daughter of a neighboring family and the only eligible young woman in the area. However, her parents are unwilling to see their daughter marry an unemployed man with few prospects and Tulpan herself appears to have little interest in Asa. The plot of the story follows the trials of Asa, his surrogate family, and his western culture-loving friend Boni.

Awards and nominations

Winner of the Prix Un Certain Regard at the 2008 Cannes Film Festival
Winner, 2008 Sutherland Trophy
Winner, Best Feature Film, at the 2008 Montreal Festival of New Cinema (Festival du nouveau cinema) 
Kazakhstan's 2009 Academy Awards official submission for the Foreign-Language Film category
Winner, Best Feature Film - Asia Pacific Screen Awards 2008
Nominated, Achievement in Directing - Asia Pacific Screen Awards 2008
Winner of Golden Peacock (Best Film) at the 39th International Film Festival
Winner of the Golden Puffin at the 2008 Reykjavík International Film Festival
Special Prize for Best Director at the 2008 East European Film Festival Cottbus

Development 
Director Sergey Dvortsevoy was born in Kazakhstan, lived there for 28 years working for an aviation company, and was very familiar with Kazakhstan's countryside. In an interview at the New York Film Festival he revealed how he had always wanted to tell a story about such a barren setting. Dvortsevoy has said that the people who live in the Hunger Steppe have always intrigued him; in the interview he revealed how he has always noticed an inner balance to the people that live in this part of the world, a happiness despite subjective adversity that has always interested him. Casting for the film took many, many months, and Dvortsevoy recalls having sent crews with small cameras to nearly every city in Kazakhstan in search of the right cast members. Having found them, he made the main cast (Asa, Samal, Ondas, Beke, Maha and Nuka) live in the yurt depicted in the film for one month before filming. In the interview, Dvortsevoy described how the story came together, 20 percent of the film was from his original script while the other 80 percent came about from a real-time reworked script based on the circumstances and conditions that arose on location. Dvortsevoy rehearsed all of the sequences with the animals or on the tractor, but the emotional scenes were rehearsed without dialogue and only fully performed at the time of filming. Samal, who played Asa's sister and the mother of the children, was the only professional actress on set having worked on stage in the theatre, however at the time of filming she was only nineteen years old. Still "only a child herself", she struggled to grow accustomed to the household chores and motherly duties during her month living in the yurt. Askhat Kuchinchirekov, the actor who portrayed Asa, was not a professional but still a student at one of the film schools in Kazakhstan. The three children were able to rehearse scenes to different degrees with the exception of Nurzhigit Zhapabayev, the little boy who played Nuka, who Dvortsevoy simply "let loose" to be as wild and natural as one of the "animals".

Reception 
The film was well received. It received a 95% rating on the website Rotten Tomatoes. Roger Ebert gave it four stars and praised it in his review, calling it "an amazing film" set in an unfamiliar world that "might as well be Mars". Upon the film's initial release in Kazakhstan, at a special screening of 1500 people, although it was praised by the herdsmen and rural folk depicted in the film, it was criticized and looked down upon by some Kazakhstan government officials, who felt that the film portrayed an even more degrading picture of Kazakhstan than Borat.

Internationally the film was a great success doing well at some of the world's most prestigious film festivals. The film has been praised for its poetic realism, the relationships and depth sustained by its characters, the film's simplicity, patience, and care for its subject matter, and also for its depiction of a world that is seemingly lost in time and space, increasingly fading away more and more into the past.

References

External links
 
 
 
 

2008 films
Films shot in Kazakhstan
Kazakhstani drama films
Kazakh-language films
2000s Russian-language films
2008 comedy-drama films